Comic Book Villains is a 2002 American black comedy film written and directed by James Robinson and starring   DJ Qualls, Donal Logue, Michael Rapaport, Natasha Lyonne and Eileen Brennan.

Synopsis
Archie (DJ Qualls) hangs out at a local comic book store and watches and narrates the film. There are two comic book shops in town; one is owned by Raymond (Donal Logue) and the other owned by Norman and Judy Link (Michael Rapaport and Natasha Lyonne), a husband and wife.

Mrs. Cresswell (Eileen Brennan), an elderly woman finds a large collection of rare comics in mint condition while going through her recently deceased son's things, and the two stores compete to convince her to sell to them.

Cast
 Donal Logue ...  Raymond McGillicudy 
 Cary Elwes ...  Carter 
 Michael Rapaport ...  Norman Link 
 Natasha Lyonne ...  Judy Link
 DJ Qualls ...  Archie 
 Eileen Brennan ...  Mrs. Cresswell 
 Monet Mazur ...  Kiki 
 Danny Masterson ...  Conan
 James Duval ... Baz

External links
 

2002 films
2002 black comedy films
American independent films
American black comedy films
Films about comics
2002 comedy films
2002 independent films
2000s English-language films
2000s American films